is a Japanese idol girl group. Their single "Dakara Don't say it!" reached the 4th place on the Weekly Oricon Singles Chart.

Discography

Albums

Singles

Timeline

References

Japanese idol groups
Japanese girl groups